Taraclia is a city located in the south of Moldova. It is the capital of Taraclia District, bordered by the autonomous region of Gagauzia, by the Cahul District and the Odessa Oblast of Ukraine. The great majority of its inhabitants (2004 census) are ethnic Bulgarians.

The Taraclia State University, co-funded by Bulgaria and Moldova, was established in 2004. The languages of education are Bulgarian and Romanian.

History
According to official figures, Taraclia was founded in 1813 by Bulgarian immigrants, although they have been settling there much earlier.
The city is one of the oldest Bulgarian settlements of the nineteenth century in what was then the southern Bessarabia.

The first settlers arrived at Taraclia during the Russo-Turkish war of 1806–1812. In 1821 it has settled a large group, which was originally located in the nearby village Aluatu. After the Russo-Turkish war of 1828–1829 a large proportion of Bulgarian immigrants settled in Bessarabia and specially in Taraclia, about 49 families have settled in the city. The last wave of migration happened in 1854, when 241 people settled there. Having the rights of colonists, they built houses and churches and had children, taking advantage of several decades of privileges granted to them by the Tsarist Russian government.

In the middle of the 19th century, the famous explorer Apollon Skalkowski wrote about them: "Residents, good hosts, herds of large cattle, sheep, and a great deal to the success of horticulture and viticulture, and women bred mulberry trees, collect the cocoons and have silk in large quantities"

During the interwar period, the city was the seat of Plasa Traian, in Cahul County, Romania.

Demography

Ethnic Structure
Taraclia ethnic Structure according to the 2014 population census.

Footnote: * There is an ongoing controversy regarding the ethnic identification of Moldovans and Romanians.

Media 
 Vocea Basarabiei, 101,9

Notable people
 Timofei Silistaru

International relations

Twin towns – Sister cities 
Taraclia is twinned with:

  Aksakovo, Bulgaria
  Nova Zagora, Bulgaria
  Sliven, Bulgaria

References

External links
 
 Taraklia TV  
 Radio Taraklia
 Bulgarian in Republic of Moldova website

Cities and towns in Moldova
Cahul County (Romania)
Taraclia District